Vinjanampadu is a village in Guntur district of Andhra Pradesh, India.

References

Villages in Guntur district